The Minister of Merchant Marine (Ministre de la Marine marchande) was responsible for the department that administered the French Merchant Navy.

Inter-war period

Ministers in the period between the two world wars were:

3 November 1929 – 21 February 1930 : Louis Rollin
21 February 1930 –  2 March 1930 : Charles Daniélou
2 March 1930 – 13 December 1930 : Louis Rollin
13 December 1930 – 27 January 1931 : Charles Daniélou
27 January 1931 – 20 February 1932 : Louis de Chappedelaine
20 February 1932 –  3 June 1932 : Charles Guernier 
3 June 1932 – 31 January 1933 : Léon Meyer   
31 January 1933 – 26 October 1933 : Eugène Frot
26 October 1933 – 26 November 1933 : Jacques Stern
26 November 1933 –  9 January 1934 : Eugène Frot
9 January 1934 – 30 January 1934 : William Bertrand
30 January 1934 –  9 February 1934 : Guy La Chambre 
9 February 1934 –  1 June 1935 : William Bertrand
1 June 1935 –  7 June 1935 : François Piétri
7 June 1935 – 17 June 1935 : Marius Roustan
17 June 1935 – 24 January 1936 : William Bertrand
24 January 1936 –  4 June 1936 : Louis de Chappedelaine
18 January 1938 – 13 March 1938 : Paul Elbel           
10 April 1938 – 13 September 1939 : Louis de Chappedelaine

World War II

The minister, and then commissaires during World War II were:

13 September 1939 – 16 June 1940 : Alphonse Rio              
24 September 1941 –  4 March 1942 : Émile Muselier (Commissaire)  
4 March 1942 –  7 June 1943 : Philippe Auboyneau  (Commissaire)
7 June 1943 –  9 November 1943 : René Mayer  (Commissaire)

Post-war ministers

Ministers after World War II were:

11 September 1948 – 28 October 1949 : André Colin                       
2 July 1950 – 12 July 1950 : Lionel de Tinguy du Pouët          
12 July 1950 – 11 August 1951 : Gaston Defferre                   
11 August 1951 –  8 March 1952 : André Morice          
20 January 1955 – 23 February 1955 : Raymond Schmittlein   
23 February 1955 – 1 February 1956 : Paul Antier
11 November 1957 – 15 April 1958 : Maurice-René Simonnet (Secretary of State)

Notes

Sources

French Merchant Marine